GeeXboX (stylized as GEExBox) is a free Linux distribution providing a media center software suite for personal computers. GeeXboX 2.0 and later uses XBMC for media playback and is implemented as Live USB and Live CD options.  As such, the system does not need to be permanently installed to a hard drive, as most modern operating systems would. Instead, the computer can be booted with the GeeXboX CD when media playback is desired. It is based on the Debian distribution of Linux.

This is a reasonable approach for those who do not need media playback services while performing other tasks with the same computer, for users who wish to repurpose older computers as media centers, and for those seeking a free alternative to Windows XP Media Center Edition.

An unofficial port of GeeXboX 1.x also runs on the Wii.

History

See also 
 List of free television software
XBMC Media Center, the cross-platform open source media player software that GeeXboX 2.0 and later uses as a front end GUI.

References

External links

ARM operating systems
Embedded Linux distributions
Free media players
Linux distributions used in appliances
Linux-based devices
Linux distributions